Dominic Thiem defeated Daniil Medvedev in the final, 6–4, 6–0, to win the singles title at the 2019 Barcelona Open.

Rafael Nadal was the three-time defending champion, but lost in the semifinals to Thiem.

Seeds
All seeds received a bye into the second round. 

Note: Diego Schwartzman, who would have been placed in the entry list on the initial entry cutoff date of 11 March 2019 and seeded 11th, entered late and played in the qualifying tournament.

Draw

Finals

Top half

Section 1

Section 2

Bottom half

Section 3

Section 4

Qualifying

Seeds

Qualifiers

Lucky losers

Qualifying draw

First qualifier

Second qualifier

Third qualifier

Fourth qualifier

Fifth qualifier

Sixth qualifier

References

External links
 Main draw
 Qualifying draw

Barcelona Open Banco Sabadell - Singles